The 2023 Backlash is the upcoming 18th Backlash professional wrestling pay-per-view (PPV)  and livestreaming event produced by WWE. It will be held for wrestlers from the promotion's Raw and SmackDown brand divisions. The event will take place on Saturday, May 6, 2023, at the Coliseo de Puerto Rico José Miguel Agrelot in San Juan, Puerto Rico, marking the first WWE event held in Puerto Rico since New Year's Revolution in January 2005, and only the second event overall. After the previous two years were titled "WrestleMania Backlash", the 2023 event reverted to its original name while still maintaining its post-WrestleMania concept, with the 2023 event based around the backlash from WrestleMania 39. Puerto Rican rapper Bad Bunny will serve as the host of the event.

Production

Background

Backlash is a recurring professional wrestling event that was established by WWE in 1999. It was held annually from 1999 to 2009, but was then discontinued until it was reinstated in 2016 and has been held every year since, except in 2019. The original concept of the event was based around the backlash from WWE's flagship event, WrestleMania. The events between 2016 and 2020 did not carry this theme; however, the 2021 event returned to this original concept and the event series was in turn rebranded as "WrestleMania Backlash". With the announcement of the 2023 event, the event reverted to its original name of Backlash while still maintaining its post-WrestleMania theme.

Announced on March 8, 2023, the 18th Backlash will feature the backlash from WrestleMania 39. It is scheduled to take place on Saturday, May 6, 2023, at the Coliseo de Puerto Rico José Miguel Agrelot in San Juan, Puerto Rico, marking the first WWE event to be held in Puerto Rico since New Year's Revolution in January 2005, and the second event overall. The event will feature wrestlers from the Raw and SmackDown brand divisions, and it will air on pay-per-view (PPV) worldwide and will be available to livestream on Peacock in the United States and the WWE Network in most international markets. It will also be the first Backlash to livestream on Binge in Australia after the Australian version of the WWE Network merged under Foxtel's channel Binge in January. Furthermore, it was announced that Puerto Rican rapper Bad Bunny, who has performed his songs as well as wrestled in matches in WWE, would serve as the host of the event. It was also announced that the May 5 episode of Friday Night SmackDown would air live from the same venue.

Storylines 
The event will include matches that result from scripted storylines, where wrestlers portray heroes, villains, or less distinguishable characters in scripted events that build tension and culminate in a wrestling match or series of matches. Results are predetermined by WWE's writers on the Raw and SmackDown brands, while storylines are produced on WWE's weekly television shows, Monday Night Raw and Friday Night SmackDown.

References

External links 
 

2023 WWE Network events
2023 WWE pay-per-view events
2023
2023 in Puerto Rico
Events in Puerto Rico
May 2023 events in the United States
Scheduled professional wrestling shows